Victor Panelin-Borg (born 11 October 1990) is a Swedish ice hockey defenceman. He currently plays with Aalborg Pirates of the Danish Metal Ligaen.

Panelin-Borg made his Elitserien (now the SHL) debut playing with Rögle BK during the 2012–13 Elitserien season.

References

External links

1990 births
Aalborg Pirates players
Graz 99ers players
Living people
Rögle BK players
Sparta Warriors players
Swedish ice hockey defencemen
People from Ängelholm Municipality